Time of Desire or The Horse Dealer's Daughters (Swedish: Hästhandlarens flickor) is a 1954 Swedish drama film directed by Egil Holmsen and starring Barbro Larsson, Margaretha Löwler and George Fant. It was shot at the Sundbyberg Studios of Europa Film in Stockholm and on location around Örsundsbro in Uppsala County. It was based on a 1935 short story by Artur Lundkvist. The film's sets were designed by the art director Arne Åkermark. In 1959, it was released on the American art house market by Janus Films.

Synopsis
Two daughters of a roguish horse trader have very different personalities but are emotionally close. When one of them takes up with a young man she encounters it drives her sister jealous.

Cast
 Barbro Larsson as 	Lilly Lilja
 Margaretha Löwler as 	Ragni Lilja
 George Fant as 	Lilja
 Birger Malmsten as 	Algot Wiberg
 Nils Hallberg as Nils
 Marianne Löfgren as 	Mrs. Johansson
 Inga Gill as 	Ella
 Ingemar Pallin as 	Paul Berger
 Harry Persson as 	Kalle
 Wiktor Andersson as 	Old-John
 Gösta Bernhard as 	Berg

References

Bibliography 
 Wallengren, Ann-Kristin.  Welcome Home Mr Swanson: Swedish Emigrants and Swedishness on Film. Nordic Academic Press, 2014.
 Wright, Rochelle. The Visible Wall: Jews and Other Ethnic Outsiders in Swedish Film. SIU Press, 1998.

External links 
 

1954 films
Swedish drama films
1954 drama films
1950s Swedish-language films
Films directed by Egil Holmsen
1950s Swedish films